Under the designation Regiment of Light Dragoons existed two different units of the U.S. Army in the late eighteenth and early nineteenth centuries, respectively. A first unit of its name was short lived, established just prior the Quasi-War with France, in 1798 and discharged in 1800.

The second unit under this designation was activated in 1808. During the War of 1812, it was temporarily designated as the 1st Regiment of Light Dragoons when the War Department created an additional similar regiment. On May 12, 1814, the additional regiment was consolidated with the 1st Regiment, which reverted to its unnumbered designation. The regiment was consolidated with the Corps of Artillery on May 17, 1815.

The very first unit of the U.S. Army designed as Light Dragoons was a single Squadron of Light Dragoons, assigned to the Legion of the United States, by September 1792.

All these units followed the model of the British Regiments of Light Dragoons that were established in the 1750s.

Background 
The RoLD (1798) was formed on July 16, 1798, at the peak of the XYZ Affair and the upcoming Quasi-war with France.

The RoLD (1808) was established on April 12, 1808, following the Chesapeake–Leopard affair, when an Act of Congress passed legislation authorizing an increase in the size of the U.S. Army, to include a regiment of dragoons.

Organization
The origins of the RoLD (1798) traces back to the Squadron of Light Dragoons, established on March 5, 1792. The squadron's four troops were assigned by September 1792 to each of the four sublegions of Legion of the United States. By November 1796 the number of these troops was reduced to only two. Two years later, they were almagamated with six newly raised troops to the Regiment of Light Dragoons. The RoLD (1798) was never completely mounted and parts of it saw service as light infantry before the regiment was dissolved in June 1800. Its two oldest "veterans" troops were discharged on June 1, 1802.

The RoLD (1808) consisted of a regimental headquarters and eight troops. The regiment was never completely organized or mounted and served as light infantry. It was re-designated the 1st Regiment of Light Dragoons since an act on January 11, 1812, created a second regiment (2nd Regiment of Light Dragoons). A further act of Congress of March 30, 1814 resulted in the two regiments being consolidated, on May 12, 1814, into one Regiment of Light Dragoons with eight troops. An act of March 3, 1815 reducing the size of the army led to the regiment being consolidated with the Corps of Artillery on May 17, 1815. Officers whose services were no longer required were discharged on June 15, 1815.

Service
Neither the 1st nor the 2nd Regiment were used as consolidated units during the War of 1812. Generals frequently used their assigned dragoons as escorts, couriers and scouts rather than fighting men.

Raid in Massena
American dragoons of the 1st Regiment and riflemen numbering together 50 men conducted a raid in Massena bringing back 8 prisoners to Sacket's harbor at the orders of American Colonel Pike on April 13, 1813. The 8 prisoners were accused of smuggling goods and items to British Canada and consorting with the British enemy.

Second Battle of Sacket’s Harbor
At the Second Battle of Sacket's Harbor May 29, 1813, Lieutenant Colonel Electus Backus rallied Dragoons of the regiment, Regular Army units, and Volunteers to counterattack a British breakthrough on the second American line of defense. The Dragoons, Regulars, and Volunteers fired behind trees inflicting considerable losses on the British. But the British swarmed the woods rooting out the concealed sheltered Americans with their bayonets. The Dragoons and the other American units fell back to their third line of defense sheltering themselves in blockhouses. The Dragoons, Regulars, and Volunteers fired from within the protection of the blockhouses. Before the British could overrun the third American line of defense, American general Jacob Brown arrived with 300 American militia making a feint towards the British ships. The British thinking that they were about to be overwhelmed by a larger  force retreated. The British force was defeated, but Backus was mortally wounded. Backus died of his wounds on June 7.

Reconassisnce Patrol in Ogdensburg
On October 13, 1813. Colonel Luckett's regiment of Dragoons entered Ogdensburg on reconnaissance for General Wilkinson. The British responded with shelling of Ogdensburg with their artillery. To avoid being spotted and engaged, Colonel Luckett and his dragoons withdrew out of Ogdensburg into the backcountry. The dragoons were then distributed in small parties along the river for the purpose of examining the country and preventing the British from obtaining information and supplies from that side of the river.

Engagement at Red Mills
On October 16, 1813. A Canadian operative Francis Cockburn commanding 200 Canadian partisans leads a raid across the border between America and Canada to engage a party of 13 American dragoons who were performing reconnaissance are stationed at a house at Red Mills. The American dragoons placed sentries around the house to keep watch. But the Canadian force surprised the sentries and surrounded the house. Some American dragoons escaped while the other dragoons sheltered in the house fire at the Canadians. The Canadians overpower the dragoons capturing a lieutenant and 7 other dragoons. 2 other dragoons are killed and 1 wounded who was left for dead but later survived and recovered. The Canadians with their 8 dragoon prisoners and captured horses withdrew back across the border.

Battle of Bladensburg
At the Battle of Bladensburg on August 24, 1814, Lieutenant Colonel Jacint Laval led 140 men of the regiment. Laval's troops were placed in support of infantrymen who later broke and ran. Many of the dragoons joined the disorderly retreat. Laval led his remaining troops in an orderly retreat toward Georgetown.

Engagements at Baltimore
Lieutenant Colonel Jacint Laval's dragoons took part in engagements of Baltimore on September 14, 1814. The dragoons conducted a rear guard action in a fighting retreat with Stansbury's brigade who were withdrawing to Baltimore. After the British were driven off and retreated. The U.S. dragoons, American light infantry, and other cavalry pursued the retreating British. But the Americans were very exhausted and could only capture a few British stragglers.

Skirmish at Kirby’s Windmill
On October 31, 1814. An American commander named Major Robert Crutchfield commanded a combined brigade of light infantry, riflemen, artillery, and other infantry. Captain John A. Bird who commanded the dragoons of the 1st regiment was also part of this task force. The Americans attempted to ambush a British amphibious raiding force that was pillaging the land. Captain Bird and his dragoons were commanded to creep up concealed on the British and surprise attack them at the same time with Crutchfield's brigade. However, Bird and his dragoons charged the British when they spotted them instead of waiting for the brigade to show up. The British were surprised by the charge and surrendered. The dragoons was about to achieve victory but someone shouted an order to retreat and the dragoons were withdrawing from the field. Captain Bird realized the error and ordered his dragoons to form up and charge again. But this had given the British time to regroup and from a defense behind a fence breastwork. The British opened a heavy volley decimating the charging dragoons. Captain Bird was wounded. The dragoons withdrew losing 2 wounded, 2 captured, and a number of horses also killed. But the dragoons withdrew with 2 British prisoners. But the American combined brigade showed up much later than expected a bit too late as the British were withdrawing in an orderly matter on their barges. The American brigade opened fire with their small arms and cannons slightly damaging two British barges. The British ships fired their heavy artillery scattering the Americans and allowing the British to withdraw safely. But the American brigade did capture 5 more British prisoners.

Notes

References

External links
Bladensburg

1st
Military units and formations established in 1808
Military units and formations disestablished in 1815
American military units and formations of the War of 1812